was a Japanese doctor and medical researcher. His most famous work covered the effects of Minamata disease, a type of severe mercury poisoning that occurred in the city of Minamata, Kumamoto Prefecture during the 1950s and 1960s. He died June 11, 2012, of acute myelocytic leukemia at his home in Kumamoto.

Timeline

1934 Born in Kagoshima Prefecture, Japan
1959 Graduates from Kumamoto University medical department and goes on to study psychoneurology 
1972 Minamata-byō is published
1989 Minamata Ga Utsusu Sekai is published
1994 Receives the Global 500 Prize from the United Nations Environment Program
1999 Retires from Kumamoto University and joins Kumamoto Gakuen University
2004 Minamata-byō is published in English as Minamata Disease
2012 Dies of leukemia

Published works in English

Harada, Masazumi. (1972). Minamata Disease. Kumamoto Nichinichi Shinbun Centre & Information Center/Iwanami Shoten Publishers.  C3036

See also

Minamata disease

External links
"10 Years of Environment and Development in Asia" (an interview with Masazumi Harada) by Keiko Ito, Asahi Shimbun, 1 October 2002
Biography by Kumamoto Gakuen University (in Japanese)

References

People from Kagoshima Prefecture
Japanese neurologists
1934 births
2012 deaths
Minamata disease
Kumamoto University alumni
Academic staff of Kumamoto University